Shaquan Montez Sweat (born September 4, 1996) is an American football defensive end for the Washington Commanders of the National Football League (NFL). He played college football at Michigan State, Copiah–Lincoln Community College, and Mississippi State before being drafted by Washington in the first round of the 2019 NFL Draft.

High school and college career
Sweat attended Stephenson High School in Stone Mountain, Georgia, where he was rated as one of the top defensive ends in the country. Sweat committed to Michigan State to play college football, where he played in two games for them in 2014, recording one sack, before redshirting in 2015. He left Michigan State in 2016 and enrolled at the Copiah–Lincoln Community College in Mississippi, where he also played for their football team. In 2017, he left again to play for the Mississippi State Bulldogs. In his first season at Mississippi State, Sweat registered 10.5 sacks and was named to the 2017 All-SEC football team. He then followed up by recording 12 sacks as a senior in 2018, making the 2018 All-SEC football team and being named an All-American.

Professional career

Washington Redskins / Football Team / Commanders

2019
At the 2019 NFL Combine, Montez set a combine record for a defensive lineman running the 40 yard dash at 4.41 seconds. At the same time, Sweat was diagnosed with hypertrophic cardiomyopathy at his combine health physical. However, it was soon discovered to have been a misdiagnosis due to an improper measuring of his heart. Sweat was eventually selected by the Washington Redskins in the first round, 26th overall, of the 2019 NFL Draft. The team traded back up into the first round to select him after using their original pick on Dwayne Haskins. He signed his four-year rookie contract on May 29, 2019, worth $11.6 million, including a $6.4 million signing bonus. In Week 3 against the Chicago Bears on Monday Night Football, Sweat recorded his first career sack in a 31–15 loss. In Week 17 against the Dallas Cowboys, Sweat sacked Dak Prescott twice, one of which that forced a fumble which was recovered, during a 47–16 loss.

2020

In a game against the Dallas Cowboys on Thanksgiving, Sweat intercepted a pass thrown by Dalton late in the fourth quarter and returned it 15 yards for a touchdown that led to a 41–16 Washington victory. The following week against the Pittsburgh Steelers, Sweat tipped a pass late in the fourth quarter that led to an interception by Jon Bostic to help secure a 23-17 win over the then-undefeated Steelers. In Week 15 Sweat batted a pass by Seattle Seahawks quarterback Russell Wilson which was then intercepted by Daron Payne.

2021
Sweat suffered a jaw fracture during a Week 8 game against the Denver Broncos and was placed on injured reserve as a result. After testing positive, he was placed on the COVID-19 reserve list on December 8, 2021. On December 18, he was taken off the COVID-19 list and placed back on the active roster two days later. In the Week 15 against the Philadelphia Eagles, Sweat recorded a sack and forced a fumble, which was recovered by Landon Collins, on quarterback Jalen Hurts.

2022
On April 27, 2022, the Commanders exercised the fifth-year option in Sweat's contract. In Week 5 of the 2022 season, Sweat accounted two of the five sacks the Commanders' defense had against the Tennessee Titans quarterback Ryan Tannehill. He contributed another two sack performance against the Houston Texans in Week 11.

NFL career statistics

Personal life
Sweat was raised by his grandparents as a child. Both his mother and older brother died in 2021, the latter being killed at the age of 27 in a shooting in Henrico County, Virginia.

As a rookie, Sweat signed a sponsorship deal with Old Spice and was featured in television commercials for their products.

When asked by the media about the COVID-19 vaccine in June 2021, he stated that he "was not a fan" and had no current plans to get one.

References

External links
Washington Commanders bio
Mississippi State Bulldogs bio
Co–Lin Wolves bio

1996 births
Living people
Players of American football from Georgia (U.S. state)
African-American players of American football
American football defensive ends
American football outside linebackers
Mississippi State Bulldogs football players
Michigan State Spartans football players
Washington Commanders players
Washington Football Team players
Washington Redskins players
Copiah-Lincoln Wolfpack football players
21st-century African-American sportspeople